De Filippo and its anglicised variant DeFilippo are surnames of Italian origin. People with those names include:

 Eduardo De Filippo (1900-1984), Italian actor, playwright, screenwriter, author and poet
 Gene DeFilippo (born ), American sports executive and former college athletics administrator
 John DeFilippo (born 1978), American football player and coach
 Luca De Filippo (1948-2015), Italian actor and director of theatre
 Luigi De Filippo (1930-2018), Italian actor, stage director and playwright
 Patrick DeFilippo (1939–2013), American mobster
 Peppino De Filippo (1903-1980), Italian actor
 Rebecca De Filippo (born 1994), Welsh rugby union player
 Titina De Filippo (1898-1963), Italian actress and playwright
 Vincent J. DeFilippo, master doll sculptor with Ideal Toy Company
 Vito De Filippo (born 1963), Italian politician

See also
 De Filippi, a surname
 

Surnames of Italian origin
Patronymic surnames
Surnames from given names